Lieutenant-Commander Gerald Wellington Williams JP (1903–1989) was a British Conservative politician. He was elected as a Member of Parliament (MP) for Tonbridge at the 1945 general election, and was re-elected at the next three elections. He resigned his seat in 1956 through appointment as Steward of the Chiltern Hundreds. He served as a Justice of the Peace in 1957, and was made High Sheriff of Kent in 1968.

References

External links 
 

1903 births
1989 deaths
Conservative Party (UK) MPs for English constituencies
UK MPs 1945–1950
UK MPs 1950–1951
UK MPs 1951–1955
UK MPs 1955–1959
High Sheriffs of Kent